is a former Japanese football player and manager.

Playing career
Yamazaki was born in Kagoshima Prefecture on October 31, 1970. After graduating from National Institute of Fitness and Sports in Kanoya, he joined Urawa Reds in 1993. Although he played several matches as left side back in first season, he could not play at all in the match behind newcomer Koichi Sugiyama in 1994. In 1995, he moved to Japan Football League (JFL) club Tokyo Gas and played many matches. In 1996, he moved to Regional Leagues club Prima Ham Tsuchiura (later Mito HollyHock). Although he could hardly play in the match in 1996, the club was promoted to JFL. In 1997, he played many matches as midfielder and he retired end of 1997 season.

Coaching career
After retirement, Yamazaki started coaching career at Oita Trinita in 1998. From 1999, he worked at many club, FC Tokyo (1999-02), Montedio Yamagata (2003–06), Albirex Niigata (2008), Sanfrecce Hiroshima (2009–12) and Nagoya Grampus (2016–17). He mainly coached youth team these clubs. In 2018, he signed with L.League club Albirex Niigata Ladies and became a manager.

Club statistics

References

External links

reds.uijin.com

1970 births
Living people
National Institute of Fitness and Sports in Kanoya alumni
Association football people from Kagoshima Prefecture
Japanese footballers
J1 League players
Japan Football League (1992–1998) players
Urawa Red Diamonds players
FC Tokyo players
Mito HollyHock players
Japanese football managers
Association football defenders
Association football midfielders